The Diving Bell and the Butterfly is a 2007 biographical drama film directed by Julian Schnabel and written by Ronald Harwood. Based on Jean-Dominique Bauby's 1997 memoir of the same name, the film depicts Bauby's life after suffering a massive stroke that left him with a condition known as locked-in syndrome. Bauby is played by Mathieu Amalric.

The Diving Bell and the Butterfly won awards at the Cannes Film Festival, the Golden Globes, the BAFTAs, and the César Awards, and received four Oscar nominations. Several critics later listed it as one of the best films of its decade. It ranks in BBC's 100 Greatest Films of the 21st Century.

Plot 
The first third of the film is told from the main character's, Jean-Dominique Bauby (Mathieu Amalric), or Jean-Do as his friends call him, first person perspective. The film opens as Bauby wakes from his three-week coma in a hospital in Berck-sur-Mer, France. After an initial rather over-optimistic analysis from one doctor, a neurologist explains that he has locked-in syndrome, an extremely rare condition in which the patient is almost completely physically paralyzed, but remains mentally normal. At first, the viewer primarily hears Bauby's "thoughts" (he thinks that he is speaking but no one hears him), which are inaccessible to the other characters (who are seen through his one functioning eye).

A speech therapist and physical therapist try to help Bauby become as functional as possible. Bauby cannot speak, but he develops a system of communication with his speech and language therapist by blinking his left eye as she reads a list of letters to laboriously spell out his messages, letter by letter.

Gradually, the film's restricted point of view broadens out, and the viewer begins to see Bauby from "outside", in addition to experiencing incidents from his past, including a visit to Lourdes. He also fantasizes, imagining beaches, mountains, the Empress Eugénie and an erotic feast with one of his transcriptionists. It is revealed that Bauby had been editor of the popular French fashion magazine Elle, and that he had a deal to write a book (which was originally going to be based on The Count of Monte Cristo but from a female perspective). He decides that he will still write a book, using his slow and exhausting communication technique. A woman from the publishing house with which Bauby had the original book contract is brought in to take dictation.

The new book explains what it is like to now be him, trapped in his body, which he sees as being within an old-fashioned deep-sea diving suit with a brass helmet, which is called a scaphandre in French, as in the original title. Others around see his spirit, still alive, as a "Butterfly".

The story of Bauby's writing is juxtaposed with his recollections and regrets until his stroke.  We see his three children, their mother (whom he never married), his mistress, his friends, and his father. He encounters people from his past whose lives bear similarities to his own "entrapment": a friend who was kidnapped in Beirut and held in solitary confinement for four years, and his own 92-year-old father, who is confined to his own apartment, because he is too frail to descend four flights of stairs.

Bauby eventually completes his memoir and hears the critics' responses. He dies of pneumonia two days after its publication. The closing credits are accentuated by reversed shootings of breaking glacier ice (the forward versions are used in the opening credits), accompanied by the Joe Strummer & the Mescaleros song "Ramshackle Day Parade".

Cast 
 Mathieu Amalric as Jean-Dominique Bauby
 Emmanuelle Seigner as Céline Desmoulins
 Anne Consigny as Claude Mendibil
 Marie-Josée Croze as Henriette Durand
 Olatz López Garmendia as Marie Lopez
 Patrick Chesnais as Dr. Lepage
 Max von Sydow as Mr. Bauby Sr.
 Isaach de Bankolé as Laurent
 Marina Hands as Joséphine
 Niels Arestrup as Roussin
 Anne Alvaro as Betty
 Zinedine Soualem as Joubert
 Emma de Caunes as Empress Eugénie
 Françoise Lebrun as Madame Bauby

Production 
The film was originally to be produced by American company Universal Studios and the screenplay was originally in English, with Johnny Depp slated to star as Bauby. According to the screenwriter, Ronald Harwood, the choice of Julian Schnabel as director was recommended by Depp. Universal subsequently withdrew, and Pathé took up the project two years later. Depp dropped the project due to scheduling conflicts with Pirates of the Caribbean: At World's End. Schnabel remained as director. The film was eventually produced by Pathé and France 3 Cinéma in association with Banque Populaire Images 7 and the American Kennedy/Marshall Company and in participation with Canal+ and CinéCinéma.

According to the New York Sun, Schnabel insisted that the movie should be in French, resisting pressure by the production company to make it in English, believing that the rich language of the book would work better in the original French, and even went so far as to learn French to make the film. Harwood tells a slightly different story: Pathé wanted "to make the movie in both English and French, which is why bilingual actors were cast"; he continues that "Everyone secretly knew that two versions would be impossibly expensive", and that "Schnabel decided it should be made in French".

Schnabel said his influence for the film was drawn from personal experience:

Several key aspects of Bauby's personal life were fictionalized in the film, most notably his relationships with the mother of his children and his girlfriend. In reality, it was not Bauby's estranged wife who stayed by the patient's bedside while he lay almost inanimate on a hospital bed, it was his girlfriend of several years.

Reception 

The film received universal acclaim from critics. Review aggregation website Rotten Tomatoes gives the film a score of 94%, based on reviews from 176 critics, and an average rating of 8.30/10, with the general consensus stated as, "Breathtaking visuals and dynamic performances make The Diving Bell and the Butterfly a powerful biopic." Metacritic gave the film an average score of 92/100, based on 36 reviews, indicating "universal acclaim".

In a 2016 poll by BBC, the film was listed as one of the top 100 films since 2000 (77th position).

Top ten lists 
The film appeared on many critics' top ten lists of the best films of 2007.

 1st
 Ann Hornaday, The Washington Post
 Carina Chocano, Los Angeles Times (tied with The Savages)
 David Edelstein, New York magazine
 Frank Scheck, The Hollywood Reporter
 Joe Morgenstern, The Wall Street Journal
 Kevin Crust, Los Angeles Times
 Kirk Honeycutt, The Hollywood Reporter
 Kyle Smith, New York Post
 Lawrence Toppman, The Charlotte Observer
 2nd
 Kenneth Turan, Los Angeles Times
 Lou Lumenick, New York Post
 Michael Phillips, Chicago Tribune
 Peter Rainer, The Christian Science Monitor
 Fredrik Gunerius Fevang, The Fresh Films
 3rd
 Dana Stevens, Slate
 Desson Thomson, The Washington Post
 Liam Lacey and Rick Groen, The Globe and Mail
 Stephanie Zacharek, Salon
 Stephen Farber, The Hollywood Reporter
 Stephen Holden, The New York Times
 Steven Rea, The Philadelphia Inquirer
 4th
 Ray Bennett, The Hollywood Reporter
 5th
 Andrew O'Hehir, Salon
 Ty Burr, The Boston Globe
 6th
 James Berardinelli, ReelViews
 Glenn Kenny, Premiere
 Peter Vonder Haar, Film Threat
 7th
 A. O. Scott, The New York Times (tied with Into the Wild)
 David Ansen, Newsweek
 Michael Rechtshaffen, The Hollywood Reporter
 Rene Rodriguez, The Miami Herald
 Sheri Linden, The Hollywood Reporter

Awards and nominations 

It was nominated for four Academy Awards, but because the film was produced by an American company, it was ineligible for the Academy Award for Best Foreign Language Film.

Notes

References

External links 
 
 
 
 
 
 "The Nerve and The Will" review at the New York Review of Books

2007 films
2007 biographical drama films
American biographical drama films
French biographical drama films
2000s French-language films
BAFTA winners (films)
Best Film Lumières Award winners
Best Foreign Language Film Golden Globe winners
Biographical films about actors
Biographical films about writers
Films about paraplegics or quadriplegics
Films based on biographies
Films directed by Julian Schnabel
Films featuring a Best Actor César Award-winning performance
Films featuring a Best Actor Lumières Award-winning performance
Films produced by Kathleen Kennedy
Films set in the 1990s
Films set in France
Films shot from the first-person perspective
Films whose director won the Best Director Golden Globe
Films whose writer won the Best Adapted Screenplay BAFTA Award
Films set in hospitals
French nonlinear narrative films
Miramax films
Pathé films
The Kennedy/Marshall Company films
France 3 Cinéma films
Canal+ films
Films scored by Paul Cantelon
Films with screenplays by Ronald Harwood
2007 drama films
Films produced by Jon Kilik
2000s American films
2000s French films
Films about disability